Anders Porsanger (1735 – 10 October 1780) was the first Sámi who received a higher education. In 1752 he was called to assist prof. Knud Leem in his work on a Sámi dictionary while simultaneously studying at the Trondheim Cathedral School. Porsanger completed his theological education in Copenhagen 1761, and the same year he was appointed a missionary to Varanger. In 1764 he returned to Trondheim to give further assistance to prof. Leem while also serving as hospital priest. In 1769 he was called by the College of Mission to Copenhagen to give a response to a suggestion from the Hungarian Jesuit scientist-priest Sajnovics that the Hungarian alphabet should be used when writing in Sámi. Sajnovics and astronomer Maximilian Hell visited Vadsø in 1769 in order to observe the Venus transit. During the visit they discovered that Sámi had the same linguistic roots as the Hungarian language. Porsanger agreed with Sajnovics on the use of the Hungarian alphabet while prof. Leem disagreed.  During Porsanger’s stay in Copenhagen he was appointed a resident chaplain at the Cathedral in Trondheim. This appointment was not well received locally, and the church made efforts to give him another position, and in 1771 he was appointed priest to Vadsø. Porsanger’s mother tongue was Sámi and he translated several parts of the Bible into the Sámi language, most of which he burned after having been forced to give up his residency in Trondheim. Porsanger died on trip to Copenhagen to apply for a new position in the Church. Along with his family he drowned in a shipwreck near the town of Risør and was buried there.

Sources 
 Martinussen, Bente 1992: Anders Porsanger - teolog og språkforsker fra 1770-tallets Finnmark. Nordlyd 1992:18.
 Arne Apelseth (2004). Anders Porsanger. In: Den låge danninga: skriftmeistring, diskursintegrering og tekstlege deltakingsformer 1760-1840. Bergen: Det historisk-filosofiske fakultet, Nordisk institutt, pp. 180–183, 183-186.
 Einar Richter Hanssen (1986). Porsanger bygdebok. Vol. 1. Porsanger, pp. 121–126.
 Rolf Grankvist (2003). Anders Porsanger. In: Norsk biografisk leksikon Vol. 2 .

1735 births
1780 deaths
Linguists from Norway
Linguists of Sámi
18th-century Norwegian clergy
People in Sámi history